Murder of Nusrat Jahan Rafi refers to the murder of a 19–year-old Bangladeshi female student who was murdered after reporting her sexual assault by her Madrasa principal to authorities. She was from Feni, Bangladesh. She suffered burns covering over 80% of her body. She died 4 days after her assault on 10 April 2019 at Dhaka Medical College and Hospital's burn unit. She recorded a statement identifying some of her attackers while in transit to the hospital.

History 
The principal of Nusrat Rafi's Madrasa, Siraj Ud Doula had given the order to murder her. She had filled a sexual harassment complaint against him. She had been lured to the Madarasa where there was an attempt to convince her to withdraw the complaint. The assailants poured kerosene on her when she refused to withdraw the complaint. 

Rafi's murder was investigated by the Police Bureau of Investigation. She made accusations against her murderers on her deathbed which was recorded by the Sonagazi Police Station Officer in Charge Moazzem Hossain. The video was leaked by that police officer to a journalist who spread the video and it went viral. Moazzem was sentenced to eight years imprisonment for his role in the leak of the video.

Aftermath
After her murder, Prime Minister Sheikh Hasina announced that the responsible individuals would be prosecuted.

On 29 May 2019, the Police Bureau of Investigation (PBI) stated sixteen individuals, including two politicians, were charged with murdering her. All 16 were sentenced to death on 24 October 2019.

After a fast-tracked trial at the women and children repression prevention tribunal in Feni, all sixteen, including former members of the school's administration (teachers and pupils) found guilty were sentenced to death.

See also
 Murder of Sohagi Jahan Tonu
 Border shooting of Felani Khatun

References 

2019 murders in Bangladesh
April 2019 crimes in Asia
Deaths by person in Bangladesh
Deaths from fire
Incidents of violence against women
Sex crimes in Asia
Violence against women in Bangladesh
History of Noakhali
Feni District
Sexual abuse scandals in Islam